First Two Pages of Frankenstein is the upcoming ninth studio album by the American indie rock band the National, scheduled to be released on April 28, 2023, by 4AD. The album was produced by The National at Long Pond studio in upstate New York and features guest appearances from Sufjan Stevens, Phoebe Bridgers, and Taylor Swift.

Background and recording
After the release of I Am Easy to Find (2019) and the cancellation of The National's touring as a result of the COVID-19 pandemic, the band members retreated from each other. Lead singer and lyricist Matt Berninger released the solo record Serpentine Prison. Bryce Dessner, now living in France, worked on film scores and classical compositions. Aaron Dessner produced two albums by Taylor Swift and recorded the highly collaborative How Long Do You Think It's Gonna Last?, the second studio album with Bon Iver's Justin Vernon as part of their side-project Big Red Machine. Bryan and Scott Devendorf assisted other musicians with making their music.

Work on a ninth National album was initially stalled while Berninger navigated "a very dark spot where I couldn't come up with lyrics or melodies at all. Even though we'd always been anxious whenever we were working on a record, this was the first time it ever felt like maybe things really had come to an end." Bryce Dessner said that the band eventually "managed to come back together and approach everything from a different angle, and because of that we arrived at what feels like a new era for the band." According to Aaron Dessner, a turning point came with the lead single "Tropic Morning News", which was co-written with Berninger's wife, Carin Besser, and partly recorded live in Hamburg: "When Matt came in with that song in the depths of his depression, it felt like a turning point for us. It's almost Dylan-esque in its lyrics and it's so much fun to play; everything suddenly felt like it was coming alive again."

The album was produced by the National at Aaron Dessner's Long Pond studio in Hudson Valley, New York. It features guest vocalists Sufjan Stevens, Phoebe Bridgers and Taylor Swift.

Release
On August 19, 2022, Aaron Dessner revealed in an interview with Laura Barton in the i newspaper that a new National album was scheduled for 2023. A standalone single, "Weird Goodbyes", featuring Bon Iver, was released three days later. The National first teased the album on social media on January 13, 2023, with a video of Berninger reading Mary Shelley's 1818 novel Frankenstein on a piano bench. The posts linked to a password-protected page on their official website. The unlocked page featured an image of an open book with text mirroring Shelley's novel, but written as a letter addressed “To Mrs. Bridgers, England” and mentioning people named "Taylor" and "Uncle Sufjan". First Two Pages of Frankenstein was officially announced on January 18, 2023, with the release of the album's lead single, "Tropic Morning News", and the announcement of a supporting tour starting in May 2023. The tour will feature the opening acts Patti Smith, Soccer Mommy, the Beths, and Bartees Strange. A second single, "New Order T-Shirt", was released on February 23, 2023. The release was accompanied by the sale of a limited edition T-shirt created in partnership with New Order.

Track listing

References

2023 albums
The National (band) albums
4AD albums
Upcoming albums